Albert Bailey may refer to:

 Albert Bailey (rugby league), English rugby league footballer who played in the 1930s
 Albert Bailey (cricketer) (1872–1950), English cricketer whose name may have been Alfred
 Bert Bailey (1868–1953), Australian writer (born Albert Edward Bailey)
 Bert Bailey (politician) (1915–1999), Australian politician
 Albert William Bailey (1873–1955), American missionary

See also
Albert Baillie (1864–1955), British clergyman